In geometric topology, a band sum of two n-dimensional knots K1 and K2 along an (n + 1)-dimensional 1-handle h called a band  is an n-dimensional knot K such that:

 There is an (n + 1)-dimensional 1-handle h connected to (K1, K2) embedded in Sn+2.
 There are points  and  such that  is attached to  along .

K is the n-dimensional knot obtained by this surgery.

A band sum is thus a generalization of the usual connected sum of knots.

See also
Manifold decomposition

References
.
.

Topology
Differential topology
Knot theory
Operations on structures